James D. Stern is an American film and Broadway producer. He won a 2003 Tony Award for Hairspray, has been nominated for other awards, and was a Drama Desk Award Winner for Stomp.

Life and career

Early life
Before starting Endgame, Stern co-directed and produced the IMAX film Michael Jordan to the Max and HBO’s It’s the Rage. On stage he produced the twelve-time Tony Award-winning Mel Brooks show The Producers and the eight time Tony Award-winning Hairspray. He produced Stomp, The Diary of Anne Frank starring Natalie Portman, Legally Blonde, the Tony Award-nominated Twilight 1992, and the Olivier Award-winning play The Weir. He produced Alan Menken's Leap of Faith during the fall of 2010.

Stern founded and ran the financial investment company and hedge fund Stern Joint Venture, L.P. (SJV). He produced with his company Endgame Entertainment and FilmDistrict the thriller Self/less.

Stern directed the 2018 documentary American Chaos.

Stern has a B.A. in directing from the University of Michigan and a M.B.A. in marketing and finance from Columbia University.

Endgame Entertainment

In 2002, Stern founded Endgame Entertainment as an independent production company to produce, develop and finance films and other forms of entertainment properties.  Under his leadership, Endgame Entertainment has financed or cofinanced more than 25 films. Endgame recently wrapped production on Seeking Justice, directed by Roger Donaldson and starring Nicolas Cage, January Jones and Guy Pearce. Recent releases include An Education (Sony Pictures Classics), which garnered three Academy Award nominations, and Every Little Step (Sony Pictures Classics), which Stern co-produced and co-directed. The documentary grossed more than $1.7 million and was short listed for an Academy Award.

Previous Endgame releases include Summit's The Brothers Bloom, Sony Pictures Classics' Easy Virtue and the Bob Dylan biopic I'm Not There, featuring an Oscar-nominated performance by Cate Blanchett. Earlier releases include Hotel Rwanda and Lord of War for Lionsgate, Proof for Miramax, Universal's White Noise, Hollywood Pictures’ Stay Alive, and New Line's Harold & Kumar Go to White Castle. Stern also co-directed and produced the documentaries The Year of the Yao (New Line) and ...So Goes the Nation (IFC).

Filmography
He was a producer in all films unless otherwise noted.

Film

As director

Miscellaneous crew

Thanks

Television

As director

Miscellaneous crew

Thanks

References

External links
 
 Endgame Entertainment
 C-SPAN Q&A interview with Stern and Adam Del Deo about ...So Goes the Nation, November 5, 2006 
 

American film directors
Film producers from New York (state)
Tony Award winners
Living people
University of Michigan alumni
Year of birth missing (living people)
Columbia Business School alumni
American independent film production company founders